Antedonidae is a family of crinoids or feather stars in the phylum Echinodermata. Members of the family are unstalked and have ten feathery arms. They can move about freely and have clawed cirri to attach them temporarily to structures.

Genera

The following genera are recognised by the World Register of Marine Species:
 sub-familia Antedoninae (Norman, 1865)
 genus Andrometra AH Clark, 1917 -- 2 species
 genus Annametra AH Clark, 1936 -- 2 species
 genus Antedon de Fréminville, 1811 -- 14 species
 genus Ctenantedon Meyer, 1972 -- 1 species
 genus Dorometra Clark, 1917 -- 9 species
 genus Euantedon AH Clark, 1912 -- 6 species
 genus Eumetra AH Clark, 1908 -- 1 species
 genus Iridometra Clark, 1908 -- 3 species
 genus Mastigometra AH Clark, 1908 -- 3 species
 genus Toxometra AH Clark, 1911 -- 5 species
 sub-familia Bathymetrinae AH Clark, 1909
 genus Argyrometra AH Clark, 1917 -- 2 species
 genus Bathymetra AH Clark, 1908 -- 2 species
 genus Boleometra AH Clark, 1936 -- 1 species
 genus Fariometra AH Clark, 1917 -- 11 species
 genus Hathrometra AH Clark, 1908 -- 1 species
 genus Meteorometra AM Clark, 1980 -- 1 species
 genus Nepiometra AH Clark, 1917 -- 1 species
 genus Orthometra AH Clark, 1917 -- 1 species
 genus Phrixometra Clark, 1921 -- 6 species
 genus Retiometra AH Clark, 1936 -- 1 species
 genus Thaumatometra AH Clark, 1908 -- 11 species
 genus Tonrometra AH Clark, 1917 -- 4 species
 genus Trichometra AH Clark, 1908  -- 3 species
 sub-familia Heliometrinae AH Clark, 1909
 genus Anthometrina Eleaume, Hess & Messing, 2011 -- 1 species
 genus Comatonia AH Clark, 1916 -- 1 species
 genus Florometra AH Clark, 1913 -- 9 species
 genus Heliometra AH Clark, 1907 -- 1 species
 sub-familia Isometrainae Fet & Messing, 2003
 genus Isometra AH Clark, 1908  -- 7 species
 sub-familia Perometrinae AH Clark, 1909
 genus Erythrometra AH Clark, 1908 -- 3 species
 genus Helenametra AM Clark, 1966 -- 1 species
 genus Hypalometra AH Clark, 1908 -- 1 species
 genus Nanometra AH Clark, 1907 -- 3 species
 genus Perometra AH Clark, 1907  -- 4 species
 sub-familia Thysanometrinae AH Clark, 1909
 genus Coccometra AH Clark, 1908 -- 3 species
 genus Thysanometra AH Clark, 1907  -- 2 species
 unassigned
 genus Adelometra AH Clark, 1907 -- 1 species
 genus Anisometra John, 1939 -- 1 species
 genus Athrypsometra Messing & White, 2001 -- 4 species
 genus Balanometra Clark, 1909 -- 1 species
 genus Caryometra AH Clark, 1936 -- 6 species
 genus Cyclometra AH Clark, 1911 -- 2 species
 genus Eometra Clark, 1936 -- 2 species
 genus Eumorphometra Clark, 1915 -- 5 species
 genus Hybometra AH Clark, 1913 -- 1 species
 genus Kempometra John, 1938 -- 1 species
 genus Leptometra AH Clark, 1908 -- 2 species
 genus Microcomatula AH Clark, 1918 -- 1 species
 genus Poliometra AH Clark, 1923 -- 1 species
 genus Promachocrinus Carpenter, 1879 -- 1 species
 genus Solanometra Clark, 1911  -- 1 species

References